Keith Gough (born 19 July 1969) is an Irish judoka. He competed in the men's extra-lightweight event at the 1992 Summer Olympics.

References

External links
 

1969 births
Living people
Irish male judoka
Olympic judoka of Ireland
Judoka at the 1992 Summer Olympics
Place of birth missing (living people)
20th-century Irish people